Rok Korošec (born 24 November 1993 in Kamnik) is a Slovenian cyclist, who most recently rode for UCI Continental team .

Major results

2014
 9th GP Slovakia, Visegrad 4 Bicycle Race
2015
 3rd Time trial, National Under-23 Road Championships
 9th Poreč Trophy
2016
 1st Grand Prix Cycliste de Gemenc
 1st  Mountains classification Tour of Bihor
 5th Overall Tour de Hongrie
1st Stage 5
 7th GP Adria Mobil
 9th Trofej Umag
 10th Trofeo Edil C
2017
 1st Trofej Umag
 Visegrad 4 Bicycle Race
1st GP Czech Republic
2nd GP Poland
 3rd Overall Okolo Jižních Čech
 4th Croatia–Slovenia
2018
 1st  Overall Gemenc Grand Prix
1st Stage 1
 Visegrad 4 Bicycle Race
3rd GP Czech Republic
3rd GP Slovakia
3rd Kerekparverseny
 4th Road race, Mediterranean Games
 5th Overall Belgrade Banjaluka
1st  Mountains classification
 7th GP Izola
 9th Croatia–Slovenia
2019
 2nd Croatia–Slovenia
 V4 Special Series
3rd Vasarosnameny–Nyiregyhaza
9th Debrecen–Ibrany
 6th Poreč Trophy
 6th Trofeo Città di Brescia
 6th GP Kranj
 10th Trofej Umag
 10th GP Slovenian Istria
2020
 8th Overall Course de Solidarność et des Champions Olympiques
1st  Mountains classification

References

External links

1993 births
Living people
Slovenian male cyclists
People from Kamnik
Competitors at the 2018 Mediterranean Games
Mediterranean Games competitors for Slovenia